The FIBA Europe Cup (FEC) is an annual professional club basketball competition organised by FIBA for eligible European clubs. It is FIBA's European-wide second level. Clubs mainly qualify for the competition based on their performance in national leagues and cup competitions, although this is not the sole deciding factor.

The league was founded in 2015 as a replacement of the FIBA EuroChallenge.

History

On June 30, 2015, FIBA announced it would start a new league to compete with Euroleague Basketball's EuroCup. The new competition, which replaced EuroChallenge, was supposed to be open for up to 100 teams to enter.

The first FIBA Europe Cup game was played on October 21, 2015, when Donar Groningen beat Egis Körmend 78–71. In the 2016–17 season, FIBA started the Basketball Champions League and since then teams from the Champions League can be transferred to the Europe Cup through their position.

Format

Tournament
The tournament proper begins with a regular season of 32 teams, divided into eight groups. Seeding is used whilst making the draw for this stage, whilst teams from the same country may not be drawn into groups together. Each team meets the others in its group in home and away games, in a round-robin format. The winning team and runner-up from each group then progress to the second round with 16 teams divided into four groups. Each team meets the others in its group in home and away games, in a round-robin format.

For the play-offs, the winning team and runner-up from each group join them and play a two-legged format. Until 2019, the fifth-placed teams and sixth-placed teams were dropped from the Basketball Champions League regular season. The regular season is usually played from October to December and the second round is played from December to January, whilst the play-offs start in February.

Finals
The Finals were played in either a Final Four tournament format or with a two-legged series.

Performance by club

A total number of 130 clubs from 38 FIBA member countries have participated in the competition. The competition has been won by 6 clubs from 5 different countries.

Statistics

All-time leaders
Statistics as of 11 June 2022.

Players in bold were active in the most recent FIBA Europe Cup season.

Points

Rebounds

Assists

Single game records 

Source: FIBA Europe Cup As of 2 May 2017.

Awards

After each round, the FIBA Europe Cup awards the "Top Performer" honour to the best player of the given round. In its inaugural season, the competition had a Final Four MVP award for the best player of a given Final Four. However, since 2015–16 the award has not been handed out.

Winning rosters

See also 

 Men's competitions
 EuroLeague
 Basketball Champions League
 EuroCup Basketball
 Women's competitions
 EuroLeague Women
 EuroCup Women
 SuperCup Women

References

External links
FIBA Europe Cup official website
FIBA official website

 
Multi-national basketball leagues in Europe

Multi-national professional sports leagues
Recurring sporting events established in 2015
2015 establishments in Europe